Tretinoin/benzoyl peroxide, sold under the brand name Twyneo, is a fixed-dose combination medication used for the treatment of acne. It contains tretinoin, a vitamin A derivative, and benzoyl peroxide, an oxidizing agent.

The combination was approved for medical use in the United States in July 2021.

References

External links 
 
 
 
 

Anti-acne preparations
Combination drugs